This is a list of all the consonants which have a dedicated letter in the International Phonetic Alphabet, plus some of the consonants which require diacritics, ordered by place and manner of articulation.

Ordered by place of articulation

Labial consonants
(articulated by using the lips)

Bilabial consonants
bilabial clicks  etc.
bilabial nasal  (man)
bilabial ejective 
voiced bilabial implosive 
voiceless bilabial plosive  (spin)
voiced bilabial plosive  (bed)
voiceless bilabial affricate 
voiced bilabial affricate 
voiceless bilabial fricative 
voiced bilabial fricative 
bilabial approximant 
bilabial trill 
bilabial percussive

Labiodental consonants
labiodental approximant 
labiodental nasal  (symphony)
voiced labiodental fricative  (van)
Voiced labiodental plosive
Voiced labiodental affricate
voiceless labiodental fricative  (fan)
voiceless rounded velarized labiodental fricative 
Voiceless labiodental plosive
Voiceless labiodental affricate

Bidental consonants
voiceless bidental fricative

Coronal consonants
(articulated by using the tip of the tongue)

Dental consonants
dental clicks  etc.
dental lateral clicks  etc.
dental ejective 
dental nasal 
voiced dental fricative  (this)
voiced dental implosive 
voiced dental plosive 
voiceless bidental fricative
voiceless dental fricative  (thing)
voiceless dental plosive 
bidental percussive

Alveolar consonants
alveolar lateral clicks  etc.
alveolar approximant  (red)
alveolar ejective 
alveolar ejective fricative 
alveolar flap 
alveolar lateral approximant  (lead)
alveolar lateral flap 
alveolar nasal  (none)
alveolar trill 
velarized alveolar lateral approximant 
voiced alveolar fricative  (zoo)
voiced alveolar implosive 
voiced alveolar lateral fricative 
voiced alveolar plosive  (done)
voiced alveolar affricate 
voiceless alveolar grooved fricative  (son)
voiceless alveolar retroflex fricative 
voiceless alveolar non-sibilant fricative 
voiceless alveolar lateral fricative 
voiceless alveolar plosive  (ton)
voiceless alveolar affricate 
voiceless alveolar lateral affricate 
ejective alveolar lateral affricate 
voiced alveolar lateral affricate

Postalveolar consonants
(post)alveolar click  etc.
voiced palato-alveolar affricate  (jug)
voiced palato-alveolar fricative  (vision)
voiceless palato-alveolar affricate  (chip)
voiceless palato-alveolar fricative  (ship)

Palatalized postalveolar consonants
voiced palatalized postalveolar fricative 
voiceless palatalized postalveolar fricative 
voiced palatalized postalveolar affricate 
voiceless palatalized postalveolar affricate

Retroflex consonants
retroflex clicks  etc. (commonly written )
retroflex approximant 
retroflex flap 
retroflex lateral flap 
retroflex lateral approximant 
voiceless retroflex lateral fricative 
retroflex nasal 
voiced retroflex fricative 
voiced retroflex plosive 
voiced retroflex affricate 
voiceless retroflex fricative 
voiceless retroflex plosive 
voiceless retroflex affricate ,

Dorsal consonants
(articulated with the middle of the tongue)

Palatal consonants
palatal clicks  etc.
palatal approximant  (yes)
palatal ejective 
palatal lateral approximant 
voiceless palatal lateral fricative 
palatal nasal 
voiced palatal fricative 
voiced palatal implosive 
voiced palatal plosive 
voiceless palatal fricative  (human, but not hum)
voiceless palatal plosive 
voiceless palatal lateral affricate 
ejective palatal lateral affricate

Labialized palatal consonants
labialized palatal approximant

Velar consonants
velar approximant 
velar ejective 
velar lateral approximant 
voiceless velar lateral fricative 
voiced velar fricative 
voiced velar implosive 
voiced velar plosive  (get)
voiceless velar fricative 
voiceless velar plosive  (kick, cat)
ejective velar lateral affricate

Labialized velar consonants
voiced labialized velar approximant  (witch)
voiceless labialized velar approximant  (which, in some dialects)

Labial–velar consonants
voiceless labial–velar plosive 
voiced labial–velar plosive 
labial-velar nasal

Uvular consonants
uvular ejective 
uvular nasal 
uvular trill 
voiced uvular fricative 
voiced uvular implosive 
voiced uvular plosive 
voiceless uvular fricative 
voiceless uvular plosive

Laryngeal consonants
(articulated with the throat)

Pharyngeal consonants
pharyngeal plosive 
voiced pharyngeal fricative 
voiceless pharyngeal fricative 
voiced pharyngeal trill 
voiceless pharyngeal trill

Glottal consonants
murmured glottal fricative or transition  (ahead)
voiceless glottal fricative or transition  (hat)
glottal plosive

Ordered by manner of articulation
Pulmonic consonants

Nasal (stop) consonants
bilabial nasal 
voiceless bilabial nasal 
labiodental nasal 
dental nasal 
alveolar nasal 
voiceless alveolar nasal 
retroflex nasal 
voiceless retroflex nasal 
palatal nasal 
voiceless palatal nasal 
velar nasal 
voiceless velar nasal 
uvular nasal

Fricative consonants
Sibilant fricatives
voiceless alveolar sibilant 
voiced alveolar sibilant 
voiceless palato-alveolar sibilant 
voiced palato-alveolar sibilant 
voiceless alveolo-palatal sibilant (palatalized postalveolar) 
voiced alveolo-palatal sibilant 
voiceless retroflex sibilant 
voiced retroflex sibilant 
Central non-sibilant fricatives
voiceless bilabial fricative 
voiced bilabial fricative 
voiceless labiodental fricative 
voiced labiodental fricative 
voiceless bidental fricative 
voiceless dental fricative 
voiced dental fricative 
voiceless alveolar non-sibilant fricative 
voiced alveolar non-sibilant fricative 
voiceless palatal fricative 
voiced palatal fricative 
voiceless velar fricative 
voiced velar fricative 
voiceless uvular fricative 
voiceless pharyngeal fricative 
voiceless epiglottal fricative 
voiceless palatal-velar fricative (not possible) 
Lateral fricatives
voiceless alveolar lateral fricative 
voiced alveolar lateral fricative 
voiceless retroflex lateral fricative 
voiceless palatal lateral fricative )
voiceless velar lateral fricative )
voiced velar lateral fricative 
both fricatives and approximants
voiced uvular fricative 
voiced pharyngeal fricative 
voiced epiglottal fricative 
Pseudo-fricatives
voiceless glottal fricative 
voiced glottal fricative (murmured)

Affricate consonants
Sibilant affricates
voiceless postalveolar affricate 
voiced postalveolar affricate 
voiceless alveolar affricate 
voiced alveolar affricate 
voiceless alveolo-palatal affricate 
voiced alveolo-palatal affricate 
voiceless retroflex affricate 
voiced retroflex affricate 
Fricated alveolar clicks  (also voiced, nasalized, etc.)
Non-sibilant affricates
Voiceless bilabial affricate 
Voiceless bilabial-labiodental affricate 
Voiceless labiodental affricate 
Voiced labiodental affricate 
Voiceless dental affricate 
Voiced dental affricate 
Voiceless retroflex nonsibilant affricate 
Voiced retroflex nonsibilant affricate 
voiceless palatal affricate 
voiced palatal affricate 
Voiceless velar affricate 
Voiced velar affricate 
Voiceless uvular affricate 
Voiced uvular affricate 
Voiceless epiglottal affricate 
Lateral affricates
voiceless alveolar lateral affricate 
voiced alveolar lateral affricate 
Voiceless palatal lateral affricate 
 Voiceless retroflex lateral affricate 
Voiceless velar lateral affricate 
Voiced velar lateral affricate

Approximant consonants
bilabial approximant 
labiodental approximant 
dental approximant 
alveolar approximant 
alveolar lateral approximant 
velarized alveolar lateral approximant 
retroflex approximant 
retroflex lateral approximant 
palatal approximant 
palatal lateral approximant 
nasal palatal approximant 
labialized palatal approximant  
velar approximant 
velar lateral approximant 
labialized velar approximant (voiced) 
voiceless labialized velar approximant 
nasal labialized velar approximant 
uvular approximant 
pharyngeal approximant 
epiglottal approximant 
voiced glottal approximant (murmured) 
voiceless glottal approximant 
voiceless nasal glottal approximant

Flap (tap) consonants
bilabial flap 
labiodental flap 
alveolar flap 
alveolar lateral flap 
retroflex flap 
retroflex lateral flap 
palatal lateral flap 
uvular flap 
velar lateral flap 
epiglottal flap

Trill consonants
bilabial trill 
alveolar trill 
alveolar fricative trill 
retroflex trill
uvular trill 
epiglottal trill

Lateral consonants
Approximants
 Alveolar lateral approximant 
 Velarized alveolar lateral approximant 
 Retroflex lateral approximant 
 Palatal lateral approximant 
 Velar lateral approximant 

Fricatives
 Voiceless alveolar lateral fricative 
 Voiced alveolar lateral fricative 
 Voiceless retroflex lateral fricative 
 Voiceless palatal lateral fricative 
 Voiced velar lateral fricative 
 Voiceless velar lateral fricative 

Affricates
 Voiceless alveolar lateral affricate 
 Voiced alveolar lateral affricate 
 Voiceless palatal lateral affricate 
 Ejective palatal lateral affricate 
 Voiceless retroflex lateral affricate 
 Ejective retroflex lateral affricate 
 Voiced velar lateral affricate 
 Voiceless velar lateral affricate 
 Ejective velar lateral affricate 

Flaps
 Alveolar lateral flap 
 Retroflex lateral flap 
 Palatal lateral flap 

Ejective
 Alveolar lateral ejective fricative 

Clicks
 Dental lateral clicks  etc.
 Alveolar lateral clicks  etc.

Ejective consonants
Plosives
bilabial ejective 
dental ejective 
alveolar ejective 
retroflex ejective 
palatal ejective 
velar ejective 
uvular ejective 
Affricates
alveolar ejective affricate 
palato-alveolar ejective affricate 
retroflex ejective affricate 
alveolo-palatal ejective affricate 
dental ejective affricate 
palatal lateral ejective affricate 
velar ejective affricate 
uvular ejective affricate 
alveolar lateral ejective affricate 
velar lateral ejective affricate 
Fricatives
bilabial ejective fricative 
labiodental ejective fricative 
dental ejective fricative 
alveolar ejective fricative 
palato-alveolar ejective fricative 
alveolo-palatal ejective fricative 
retroflex ejective fricative 
palatal ejective fricative 
velar ejective fricative 
uvular ejective fricative 
pharyngeal ejective fricative 
alveolar lateral ejective fricative 
velar lateral ejective fricative

Implosive consonants
voiced bilabial implosive 
voiceless bilabial implosive 
voiced dental implosive 
voiced alveolar implosive 
voiceless alveolar implosive 
voiced retroflex implosive 
voiced palatal implosive 
voiceless palatal implosive 
voiced velar implosive 
voiceless velar implosive 
voiced uvular implosive 
voiceless uvular implosive

Labialized consonants
Plosives
voiceless labialized velar plosive 
voiced labialized velar plosive 
Voiceless labialized labial-velar plosive 
voiceless labialized uvular plosive 
voiced labialized uvular plosive 
Fricatives
voiceless labialized velar fricative  
voiced labialized velar fricative 
voiceless labialized uvular fricative 
voiced labialized uvular fricative 
Approximants
labialized palatal approximant  
(voiced) labialized velar approximant 
voiceless labialized velar approximant 
nasal labialized velar approximant

Palatalized consonants
voiced palatalized postalveolar fricative 
voiceless palatalized postalveolar fricative 
voiced palatalized postalveolar affricate 
voiceless palatalized postalveolar affricate 
voiceless palatalized velar plosive

Pharyngealized consonants
 voiceless pharyngealized alveolar sibilant 
 voiced pharyngealized alveolar sibilant 
 voiceless pharyngealized alveolar plosive 
 voiced pharyngealized alveolar plosive 
 voiceless pharyngealized dental fricative 
 voiced pharyngealized dental fricative 
 voiceless pharyngealized alveolar lateral fricative 
 voiced pharyngealized alveolar lateral fricative 
 pharyngealized glottal stop 
 pharyngealized alveolar lateral approximant 
 pharyngealized alveolar nasal

Velarized consonants
Voiceless velarized alveolar sibilant 
Voiced velarized dental fricative 
Voiceless velarized alveolar plosive 
Velarized alveolar flap 
Voiceless velarized uvular plosive 
Voiceless velarized uvular fricative 
Voiced velarized uvular fricative 
Voiceless velarized alveolar lateral fricative 
Voiced velarized alveolar lateral fricative 
Velarized alveolar lateral approximant

Click consonants
The less common clicks, such as are found in Taa, are not included.

Simple clicks
bilabial clicks 
either velar:
voiceless bilabial click 
voiced bilabial click 
bilabial nasal click 
or uvular:

dental clicks  (= )
either velar:
voiceless dental click 
voiced dental click 
dental nasal click 
or uvular:

(post)alveolar click  (= )
either velar:
voiceless alveolar click 
voiced alveolar click 
alveolar nasal click 
or uvular:

alveolar lateral clicks  (= )
either velar:
voiceless alveolar lateral click 
voiced alveolar lateral click 
alveolar lateral nasal click 
or uvular:

retroflex clicks  (= )
either velar:
voiceless retroflex click 
voiced retroflex click 
retroflex nasal click 
or uvular:

palatal clicks  (= )
either velar:
voiceless palatal click 
voiced palatal click 
palatal nasal click 
or uvular:

Glottalized clicks
velar (uvular clicks not shown):
glottalized bilabial nasal click 
glottalized dental nasal click 
glottalized alveolar nasal click 
glottalized alveolar lateral nasal click 
glottalized retroflex nasal click 
glottalized palatal nasal click 
Pulmonic-contour clicks
voiceless bilabial linguo-pulmonic stop 
voiced bilabial linguo-pulmonic stop 
voiceless dental linguo-pulmonic stop 
voiced dental linguo-pulmonic stop 
voiceless alveolar linguo-pulmonic stop 
voiced alveolar linguo-pulmonic stop 
voiceless alveolar lateral linguo-pulmonic stop 
voiced alveolar lateral linguo-pulmonic stop 
voiceless retroflex linguo-pulmonic stop 
voiced retroflex linguo-pulmonic stop 
voiceless palatal linguo-pulmonic stop 
voiced palatal linguo-pulmonic stop 
voiceless bilabial linguo-pulmonic affricate 
voiced bilabial linguo-pulmonic affricate 
voiceless dental linguo-pulmonic affricate 
voiced dental linguo-pulmonic affricate 
voiceless alveolar linguo-pulmonic affricate 
voiced alveolar linguo-pulmonic affricate 
voiceless alveolar lateral linguo-pulmonic affricate 
voiced alveolar lateral linguo-pulmonic affricate 
voiceless retroflex linguo-pulmonic affricate 
voiced retroflex linguo-pulmonic affricate 
voiceless palatal linguo-pulmonic affricate 
voiced palatal linguo-pulmonic affricate 
Ejective-contour clicks
bilabial linguo-glottalic stop 
dental linguo-glottalic stop 
alveolar linguo-glottalic stop 
alveolar lateral linguo-glottalic stop 
retroflex linguo-glottalic stop 
palatal linguo-glottalic stop 
bilabial linguo-glottalic affricate 
dental linguo-glottalic affricate 
alveolar linguo-glottalic affricate 
alveolar lateral linguo-glottalic affricate 
retroflex linguo-glottalic affricate 
palatal linguo-glottalic affricate

Percussive consonants
These are not found in any language, but occur as phonetic detail or through speech defects.
bilabial percussive 
bidental percussive 
Sublaminal lower-alveolar percussive

See also
Consonant
Index of phonetics articles

Consonants
Linguistics lists